Antwaun is an African-American English given name associated with Antoine and Anthony in use in the United States. Notable people with this name include the following people.

Antwaun Carter (born 1981), American gridiron football player
Antwaun Molden (born 1985), American gridiron football player
Antwaun Stanley (born c. 1987), American singer and songwriter
Antwaun Woods (born 1993), American gridiron football player

See also

Antwain, given name
Antwan, given name
Antwuan, given name
Antwaune Ponds

Notes

African-American given names